The following lists events that happened during 2005 in Rwanda.

Incumbents 
 President: Paul Kagame 
 Prime Minister: Bernard Makuza

References

 
2000s in Rwanda
Years of the 21st century in Rwanda
Rwanda
Rwanda